Open Letter is an album by guitarist Ralph Towner recorded in 1991 and 1992 and released on the ECM label.

Reception
The Allmusic review by Rick Anderson awarded the album 3 stars, stating, "Ralph Towner's a difficult case. The snoozy noodlings of his former band Oregon can be downright stupefying, but his solo work is often, though not always, quite a bit more interesting. Open Letter walks both sides of the line, but succeeds more often than it fails.

Track listing 
All compositions by Ralph Towner except as indicated
 "The Sigh" - 5:13   
 "Wistful Thinking" - 3:58   
 "Adrift" - 6:10   
 "Infection" (Peter Erskine, Ralph Towner) - 3:18   
 "Alar" - 7:14   
 "Short 'n Stout" - 3:04   
 "Waltz For Debby" (Bill Evans) - 4:16   
 "I Fall in Love Too Easily" (Jules Styne, Sammy Cahn) - 4:19   
 "Magic Pouch" - 5:06   
 "Magnolia Island" - 4:35   
 "Nightfall" - 6:27 
Recorded at Rainbow Studio in Oslo, Norway in July 1991 and February 1992

Personnel 
 Ralph Towner — twelve-string guitar, classical guitar, synthesizer
Peter Erskine — drums

References 

ECM Records albums
Ralph Towner albums
1992 albums
Albums produced by Manfred Eicher